"Whisper" is a song co-written and recorded by American country music artist Lacy J. Dalton.  it was released in April 1981 as the third single from the album Hard Times.  The song reached number 10 on the Billboard Hot Country Singles & Tracks chart.  The song was written by Dalton and Mark Sherrill.

Chart performance

References

1981 singles
1981 songs
Lacy J. Dalton songs
Song recordings produced by Billy Sherrill
Columbia Records singles
Songs written by Lacy J. Dalton
Songs written by Mark Sherrill